Larraz is a surname. Notable people with the surname include:

José Ramón Larraz (1929–2013), Spanish film director
Julio Larraz (born 1944), Cuban painter, sculptor, printmaker and caricaturist
Pedro Cortés y Larraz (1712–1787), Guatemalan Roman Catholic bishop
Roberto Larraz (1898–1978), Argentine fencer
Vicky Larraz (born 1962), Spanish singer and television presenter